Bhargav Bhatt may refer to:
 Bhargav Bhatt (cricketer)
 Bhargav Bhatt (mathematician)